The women's rugby sevens tournament at the 2019 Southeast Asian Games were held from 7 to 8 December 2019 in the Philippines. 6 Southeast Asian teams played in the women's competition.

All matches were played at the Clark Parade Grounds in Angeles City.

Competition schedule

Source: 2019 SEA Games Official Calendar

Participating nations
The following six teams participated for the women's competition.

  (LAO)
  (INA)
  (MAS)
  (PHI)
  (SGP)
  (THA)

Results 
All times are Philippine Standard Time (UTC+8).

Group stage

Final round
5th place playoff

Bronze medal match

Gold medal match

See also
Men's tournament

References

External links
  

Women